The Bosnian Journal of Basic Medical Sciences is a quarterly peer-reviewed open-access medical journal published by the Association of Basic Medical Sciences of Federation of Bosnia and Herzegovina. It covers all aspects of basic medical sciences, as well as translational and clinical medical research.

Abstracting and indexing
The journal is abstracted and indexed in Science Citation Index Expanded, MEDLINE/PubMed, Scopus, EBSCO databases, CAB Abstracts, and Global Health. According to the Journal Citation Reports, the journal has a 2020 impact factor of 3.36.

References

External links

English-language journals
Publications established in 1998
General medical journals
Academic journals published by learned and professional societies
Quarterly journals